Adolphus Ludigo-Mkasa, also known as Adolofu Mukasa Ludigo (c. 1861 – June 3, 1886), was a Ugandan Catholic martyr killed for his faith.

Life
Ludigo-Mkasa was a Munyoro from Mwenge in the western part of the country. At a young age, he was abducted by Baganda raiders and became a companion of Charles Lwanga at court. Ludigo-Mkasa was put in charge of the Kabaka’s gardens. 

Protestant missionaries began arriving in Buganda in 1877, followed two years later by the Catholic Missionaries of Africa. King Muteesa I welcomed the missionaries and played off the Catholics, Anglicans, and the Moslem traders, seeming to favor first one, then another, for political gain. The court was at Nabulagala, with a Catholic mission nearby at Kasubi. It was there that Ludigo-Mkasa began to take religious instruction around 1881.

Young King Mwanga II succeeded to the throne in 1884 at the age of about sixteen. He came to see the Christians as a threat, partly due to German incursions on the coast, and because the Christians encouraged the pages in his court to resist his advances. 

Adolphus received his baptism on November 17, 1885. King Mwanga demanded that Christian converts abandon their new faith and executed many Anglicans and Catholics who did not. Adolphus was one of many Christians put to death by the king between 1885 and 1887. He was burnt alive on the 3rd of June 1886 in Namugongo at the age of about twenty-five. His day of martyrdom, June 3, is remembered as the feast day of the Uganda Martyrs.

References

External links
 Adolphus Ludigo-Mukasa bio

1861 births
1886 deaths
19th-century Christian saints
19th-century executions by Uganda
19th-century Roman Catholic martyrs
Converts to Roman Catholicism from pagan religions
Executed Ugandan people
People executed by Buganda
People executed by Uganda by burning
Ugandan Roman Catholic saints